The Ramblers is a Namibian football club from Pionierspark, Windhoek.

History
The Ramblers have played in the country's highest division, the Namibia Premier League and the club was previously known as Windhoek Optics Ramblers. They sold their place in the premier league and now focus on growing talent from children upwards. Through the youth development programs, Ramblers were able to nature talent and build a first team squad currently boasting 25 graduates of the Ramblers Academy, of which 4 went to represent Namibia at the 2021 U20 African Cup Of Nations.

Sponsor
As of 1 June 2019, the Ohlthaver & List (O&L) Group became the club's main sponsor. As the O&L Group purpose ‘Creating a Future, Enhancing Life’ states, the O&L Ramblers Soccer Academy will endeavor to live this philosophy by creating an environment where young soccer players/enthusiasts can really be part of the soccer family, now and in the future, while making a positive change in their sports lives.

Women's team
In 2019, Ramblers decided to have a new addition in their ranks by creating the women's team. This decision was taken by Hafeni Ndeitunga and Alessandro Micheletti as they saw that football was an equal game. The women's team currently plays in NFA Women's Super League (Namibia's Women's top flight football league)
Coaches
 Hafeni Ndeitunga (head coach)
 Ileni Hitula (assistant coach)
 Roshaan Leukes (assistant coach)

Achievements
Namibia Premier League: 1
1992

NFA-Cup: 1
2005

Performance in CAF competitions
African Cup of Champions Clubs: 1 appearance
1993: Preliminary Round

2021/22 SQUAD

Notable coaches
Men's Team
 Peter Hyballa (2002–03)
 Lutz Pfannenstiel (2009–10)
 Tiro Thabanello
 Benedict's Haoseb (2015–19)

External links
Ramblers official website

Football clubs in Namibia
Sport in Windhoek
1945 establishments in South West Africa
Association football clubs established in 1945